Ruaraka Stadium is a multi-purpose stadium in Nairobi, Kenya.  It used mostly for football (soccer) matches and is the primary home stadium of Tusker FC.  The stadium holds 4,000 people.

External links
Stadium information

Football venues in Kenya
Multi-purpose stadiums in Kenya